Eric Louis McKitrick (July 5, 1919 – April 24, 2002) was an American historian, best known for The Age of Federalism: The Early American Republic, 1788–1800 (1993) with Stanley Elkins, which won the Bancroft Prize in 1994.

Life
McKitrick was born in Battle Creek, Michigan.  He graduated from Columbia University with a B.A. in 1949, an M.A. in 1951, and a Ph.D. in 1959. He taught at the University of Chicago and at Rutgers University's Douglass College in the 1950s, and Columbia University from 1960 to 1989 before retiring as an emeritus professor of history. In 1973–74 he was the Pitt Professor of American History and Institutions at Cambridge University and in 1979–80 the Harold Vyvyan Harmsworth Professor of American History at Oxford University.

McKitrick reviewed for The New York Review of Books

He died in New York City, aged 82.

Awards
 1960 Dunning Prize
 1970 Guggenheim Fellowship
 1994 Bancroft Prize

Works
  (reprinted 1988)

References

20th-century American historians
American male non-fiction writers
1919 births
2002 deaths
Columbia University School of General Studies alumni
University of Chicago faculty
Rutgers University faculty
Columbia University faculty
Academics of the University of Cambridge
Harold Vyvyan Harmsworth Professors of American History
Bancroft Prize winners
20th-century American male writers
Columbia Graduate School of Arts and Sciences alumni